Tudorel Vișan Zamfirescu (born 5 June 1969) is a Romanian former footballer who played as a defender.

Honours
Steaua București
Divizia A: 1996–97
Cupa României: 1996–97

References

1969 births
Living people
Romanian footballers
Association football defenders
Liga I players
Liga II players
FC Sportul Studențesc București players
FC Steaua București players
CSM Jiul Petroșani players
FCM Târgoviște players
FC Olimpia Satu Mare players
ASC Daco-Getica București players
Romanian expatriate footballers
Expatriate footballers in Germany
Romanian expatriate sportspeople in Germany
Footballers from Bucharest